Absa Bank Zambia Plc, formerly Barclays Bank of Zambia, is a commercial bank in Zambia. It is licensed by the Bank of Zambia, the central bank and national banking regulator.

Location
The headquarters and main branch of Absa Bank of Zambia are located at 4643 and 4644 Elunda Office Park, Addis Ababa Round About, in the city of Lusaka, Zambia's capital city. The geographical coordinates of the bank's headquarters are:

Overview
The bank is a large financial institution in Zambia. The institution serves the banking needs of large corporations, small and medium sized enterprises, individuals and government departments. As of 31 December 2019, the bank's total assets were valued at ZMW:12.019 billion (US$688.19 million), with shareholders' equity of ZMW:1,164,777,000 (US$66.7 million). As of December 2019, the bank employed 847 people in Zambia.

History
According to its website, Barclays Bank has been present in Zambia since 1918. However, the bank was licensed in its present form in 1974. The bank is a member of the Absa Group Limited, which was a subsidiary of Barclays Bank Plc., until June 2017, when Barclays Plc decided to sell down its shares in the group. In March 2018, Barclays Africa Group made a decision to re-brand to Absa Group Limited.

Name change
In 2016, Barclays Bank Plc, owned 62.3 percent of Barclays Africa Group (BAG). At that time BAG was the parent company of Barclays Bank of Zambia. Barclays decided to divest its majority shareholding in BAG, worth £3.5 billion then. In December 2017, Barclays reduced its shareholding in BAG to 14.9 percent.

Following those events, BAG re-branded to Absa Group Limited in 2018. Under the terms of that re-brand, Absa had until June 2020 to change the names of its subsidiaries in 12 African countries.

In Zambia, the re-brand concluded on 10 February 2020, when both the bank's legal and business names became Absa Bank Zambia Plc.

Branch network
, the bank maintained a network of over 47 branches.

Governance
The Chairperson of the Board of Directors of Barclays Bank Zambia, is Chishala Kateka. Mizinga Melu, serves as the Managing Director of the bank.

See also

References

External links
  Website of Absa Bank Zambia
  Website of Bank of Zambia

Banks of Zambia
Absa Group Limited
Companies based in Lusaka
Banks established in 1918
1918 establishments in Northern Rhodesia